Pacra (possibly from Quechua p'aqra bald, paqra agave) is a mountain in the north of the Cordillera Blanca in the Andes of Peru, of  high. It is located in the Ancash Region, Corongo Province, in the north of the Cusca District.

References

Mountains of Peru
Mountains of Ancash Region